The fifth season of MacGyver, an American television series, began September 18, 1989, and ended on April 30, 1990. It aired on ABC. The region 1 DVD was released on March 14, 2006.

Production 
During the fifth season, Dana Elcar began suffering the severe effects of aging glaucoma. Because of this, the producers of MacGyver wanted to write him out of the show. Richard Dean Anderson, however, suggested that Elcar’s disease be incorporated into the show, allowing him to continue his portrayal of Pete Thornton.

Episodes

References

External links 
 
 

1989 American television seasons
1990 American television seasons
MacGyver (1985 TV series) seasons